Union Grove State Park is a South Dakota state park in Union County, South Dakota in the United States.  The park is open for year-round recreation including camping, horseback riding, biking, hiking and cross country skiing. There are 25 campsites including 4 horse camp sites.

References

External links
 Union Grove State Park

Protected areas of Union County, South Dakota
State parks of South Dakota